Lime Kiln Creek (or Lime Kiln Drain) was an outlet onto the Humber Estuary in Kingston upon Hull, England, thought to be a previous outlet of the River Hull onto the estuary. It was blocked off during the construction of the Albert Dock in the 1860s.

History

The creek takes its name from lime kilns which once stood in its vicinity.

It is thought that the creek was once the outlet of the River Hull before its flow was redirected eastwards along the Sayer Creek in early medieval times.

The creek was the site of a goods station and wharf (Lime Kiln Creek wharf) used by the Hull and Selby Railway and Manchester, Sheffield and Lincolnshire Railway from the 1840s onwards.

The Creek was stopped up as a result of the building of the West Dock (Albert Dock) in the 1860s.

References

History of Kingston upon Hull
Rivers of the East Riding of Yorkshire
0LimeKiln